Nenasala (Wisdom Outlet) is a telecentre project by the Government of Sri Lanka. Developed under the e-Sri Lanka Initiative, which is implemented by the ICT Agency of Sri Lanka. Communication centers are being built by the government in rural areas to help fight poverty, develop culture and commerce, and sustain peace. There are currently 751 such centers in the country, ⁣ with the most recent being established in the Kuliyapitiya Technical college. However, the number of e-Nenasala centers was expected to extend up to 1000 centers by the end of the year 2010.

Types of Nenasala
There are several models of Nenasala. They are:
 Rural Knowledge Centers
 e-Libraries
 Distance Learning and e-Learning Centers
 Tsunami Camp Computer Kiosks

See also
 Asia-Pacific Telecentre Network
 Information and Communication Technology Agency of Sri Lanka
 Telecentre.org Academy of Sri Lanka

References

External links
 Nenasala Official Website
 nenasala Thelulla

Government of Sri Lanka